Tom Pearson (4 October 1926 – 14 September 2010) was a Scottish rugby union player. He became the 102nd President of the Scottish Rugby Union.

Rugby Union career

Amateur career

Pearson was educated at Bell Baxter School in Cupar.

Pearson played for Howe of Fife.

Coaching career

Pearson coached at Howe of Fife.

Referee career

Pearson refereed rugby union matches.

Administrative career

Pearson was first elected to the SRU committee as the Midlands District representative in season 1969–1970.

Pearson was Chairman of the Scotland selection committee from 1976 to 1980.

Pearson helped to create the SRU coaching panel which installed a national technical director.

Pearson managed the Scotland tour to Japan in 1977.

Pearson suffered a heart attack in 1980 and stood down from the SRU. He recovered and carried on teaching till 1985 when he retired. He then joined the SRU again as youth convenor.

Pearson became the 102nd President of the Scottish Rugby Union. He served the standard one year from 1988 to 1989.

Pearson was a firm believer in progressing youth rugby and chaired a number of initiatives to develop youth participation.

Outside of rugby union

Pearson became a P.E. teacher and also became an Assistant Rector at Buchaven High School.

Tributes

Tributes to Pearson came from around Scottish rugby union:

David Rollo:
He was a great mentor and really was 'Mr Howe of Fife' to me. He guided me through my career really. In his playing days, when he was captain, everything revolved around him and everyone appreciated how he handled players. He always had time to listen to you as a player, and give you his report, without ducking the criticism. There were no coaches then and you were made captain because of what you knew about the game, and Tom knew what he was doing. He also had great expertise in the sevens game and was a major influence on sport at Buckhaven and developing rugby at the Howe and further afield with his work at the SRU. I still remember how he would encourage boys from Buckhaven to come over the hill to the Howe to play, but whatever age they got to they still called him 'Sir', not 'Mr Pearson' and certainly not 'Tom'. He held that respect.

Jim Telfer:
Tom was one of the originators of the SRU coaching panel that would establish the first coaching courses nationally and regionally. We had a very good coaching advisory panel with a number of PE teachers closely involved, and he was part of the SRU when it appointed the first technical director John Roxburgh. Other sports in Scotland went on to copy what that panel had done with the SRU and we had visitors from across the British Isles and Europe coming to the courses. I remember Tom as a hard-working chap who was a stickler for details and high standards.

Ian McLauchlan, the Scotland prop and SRU president: 
Tom was our team manager on the tour of Japan in 1977 and he had a big input into the SRU at that time. Tom was a very dedicated rugby man, who served the union very well and an altogether decent lad.

References

1926 births
2010 deaths
Rugby union players from Fife
Scottish rugby union players
Presidents of the Scottish Rugby Union
Howe of Fife RFC players
Rugby union flankers